Danil Pavlovych Skorko (born 11 July 2002) is a Ukrainian  professional footballer who plays as a defender for Oleksandriya.

Club career

Early years
Danyo Skorko started his career at Yunist Chernihiv until 2016.

Dynamo Kyiv
At age 14 he moved to Kyiv and started playing for the under-19 squad of Dynamo Kyiv. He made his debut on 2 September 2018 in the match against Mairupol, coming on as a substitute in the 82nd minute replacing Maksym Duhan.

Chornomorets Odesa
In July 2021 he moved on loan to Chornomorets Odesa.
On 25 July he made his league debut against Desna Chernihiv at the Stadion Yuri Gagarin in Chernihiv.

Zorya Luhansk
On 13 January 2022, he moved to Zorya Luhansk in Ukrainian Premier League, signing a 3-year contract with the club until 2025.

Oleksandriya
On 15 August 2022 he signed for Oleksandriya in the Ukrainian Premier League.

International career
On 13 October 2018 he scored his first goal for the Ukraine under-17 side against Gibraltar. On 13 October 2021, he played also for the Ukraine under-21 against Northern Ireland at the Ballymena Showgrounds in Ballymena.

Career statistics

Club

Honours
FC Dynamo Kyiv U-19
 Ukrainian Premier League Reserves: (2) 2018-19, 2019-20

References

External links
 
 

2002 births
Living people
Footballers from Chernihiv
FC Yunist Chernihiv players
FC Dynamo Kyiv players
FC Chornomorets Odesa players
FC Zorya Luhansk players
FC Oleksandriya players
Association football defenders
Ukrainian footballers
Ukrainian Premier League players
Ukraine youth international footballers
Ukraine under-21 international footballers